The 16th Los Angeles Film Critics Association Awards were announced on 16 December 1990 and given on 16 January 1991.

Winners
Best Picture:
Goodfellas
Runner-up: Dances with Wolves
Best Director:
Martin Scorsese – Goodfellas
Runner-up: Kevin Costner – Dances with Wolves
Best Actor:
Jeremy Irons – Reversal of Fortune
Runner-up: Philippe Noiret – Life and Nothing But (La vie et rien d'autre)
Best Actress:
Anjelica Huston – The Grifters and The Witches
Runner-up: Joanne Woodward – Mr. & Mrs. Bridge
Best Supporting Actor:
Joe Pesci – Goodfellas
Runner-up: Bruce Davison – Longtime Companion
Best Supporting Actress:
Lorraine Bracco – Goodfellas
Runner-up: Dianne Wiest – Edward Scissorhands
Best Screenplay:
Nicholas Kazan – Reversal of Fortune
Runner-up: Charles Burnett – To Sleep with Anger
Best Cinematography:
Michael Ballhaus – Goodfellas
Runner-up: Vittorio Storaro – The Sheltering Sky
Best Music Score:
Richard Horowitz and Ryuichi Sakamoto – The Sheltering Sky
Runner-up: Randy Newman – Avalon
Best Foreign Film:
Life and Nothing But (La vie et rien d'autre) • France
Runner-up: Cyrano de Bergerac • France
Best Non-Fiction Film (tie):
Paris Is Burning
Pictures of the Old World (Obrazy starého sveta) 
Best Animation:
The Rescuers Down Under
Experimental/Independent Film/Video Award:
Marlon Riggs – Tongues Untied
New Generation Award:
Jane Campion
Career Achievement Award (tie):
Blake Edwards
Chuck Jones
Special Citation:
Charles Burnett

References

External links
16th Annual Los Angeles Film Critics Association Awards

1990
Los Angeles Film Critics Association Awards
Los Angeles Film Critics Association Awards
Los Angeles Film Critics Association Awards
Los Angeles Film Critics Association Awards